Wiser Lake is a lake in the U.S. state of Washington. It is split in two halves by State Route 539 (the Guide Meridian).

Wiser Lake bears the name of Jack Wiser, a pioneer who settled there.

See also
List of lakes in Washington

References

Lakes of Whatcom County, Washington
Lakes of Washington (state)